Berta Alice Victoria "Tollie" Zellman (31 August 1887 – 9 October 1964) was a Swedish actress. She appeared in 49 films between 1906 and 1964. Tollie Zellman appeared on scene first 1907. She is one of Sweden's most famous comediennes. From 1941 to 1947 she worked at the Oscar Theater in Stockholm. Her most famous role was as Mrs Dulcie Baxter in a play by Hubert Henry Davies, The Mollusc (1914).   She played Mrs Baxter on stage at the Blanche Theatre in Stockholm in 1922 as well as in radio 1933. From 1907 to 1952 she played in around 50 films.

Selected filmography
 Kolingens galoscher (1912)
 Norrtullsligan (1923)
 Servant's Entrance (1932)
 Two Men and a Widow (1933)
 Wife for a Day (1933)
 Andersson's Kalle (1934)
 Munkbrogreven (1935)
 Kungen kommer (1936)
 Poor Millionaires (1936)
 Our Boy (1936)
 The Ghost of Bragehus (1936)
 Happy Vestköping (1937)
 Career (1938)
 Comrades in Uniform (1938)
 Between Us Barons (1939)
 Circus (1939)
 Emilie Högquist (1939)
 Nothing But the Truth (1939)
 One, But a Lion! (1940)
 Heroes in Yellow and Blue (1940)
 Poor Ferdinand (1941)
 Tonight or Never (1941)
 There's a Fire Burning (1943)
 I Killed (1943)
 Blåjackor (1945)
 Idel ädel adel (1945)
 Tired Theodore (1945)
 While the Door Was Locked (1946)
 Lilla Märta kommer tillbaka (1948)
 The Green Lift (1952)

References

External links

Further reading 
 

1887 births
1964 deaths
Swedish film actresses
Swedish silent film actresses
Actresses from Stockholm
Burials at Norra begravningsplatsen
20th-century Swedish actresses